Vladimir Andryushchenko (Russian: Владимир Васильевич Андрющенко, born 8 April 1982) is a Paralympian athlete from Russia competing mainly in category F12 throwing events.

Andryushchenko has competed at two summer Paralympics. In 2004 he competed in the F12 javelin, F13 shot put and won a silver medal in the F12 discus. In 2008 he competed in the F11/12 discus and won a second silver in the F11/12 shot put.

Honours and awards
Andryushchenko has been recognised several times by his country for his achievements in sport. In 2012 he was made Merited Master of Sports of the USSR.

References

External links
 
 

Paralympic athletes of Russia
Athletes (track and field) at the 2004 Summer Paralympics
Athletes (track and field) at the 2008 Summer Paralympics
Athletes (track and field) at the 2012 Summer Paralympics
Paralympic silver medalists for Russia
Living people
1982 births
Russian male shot putters
Russian male discus throwers
Honoured Masters of Sport of the USSR
Medalists at the 2004 Summer Paralympics
Medalists at the 2008 Summer Paralympics
Medalists at the 2012 Summer Paralympics
Paralympic medalists in athletics (track and field)
Visually impaired shot putters
Visually impaired discus throwers
Paralympic shot putters
Paralympic discus throwers